"North Pyeongan Province" or "Pyeonganbuk-do" is, according to South Korean law, a province of the Republic of Korea, as the South Korean government formally claims to be the legitimate government of the whole of Korea. The area constituting the province is under the de facto jurisdiction of North Korea.

As South Korea does not recognize changes in administrative divisions made by North Korea, official maps of the South Korean government shows North Pyeongan Province in its pre-1945 borders. The area corresponds to North Korea's North Pyongan Province, almost all of Chagang Province and a small part of Ryanggang Province.

To symbolize its claims, the South Korean government established The Committee for the Five Northern Korean Provinces as an administrative body for the five northern provinces. A governor for North Pyeongan Province is appointed by the President of South Korea.

Administrative divisions 
Pyeonganbuk-do is divided into 1 cities (si) and 19 counties (gun).

City 
 Sineuiju
 86 dong

County 
 Euiju
 1 eup : Uiju
 12 myeon : Gasan, Gogwan, Goryeongsak, Goseong, Gwangpyeong, Bihyeon, Songjang, Sujin, Oksang, Wolhwa, Wiwon, Wihwa
 Yongcheon (용천, 龍川)
 1 eup : Yongampo
 11 myeon : Dongha, Naejung, Dongsang, Bura, Bukjung, Yangseo, Yanggwang, Yangha, Oesang, Oeha, Sindo
 Cheolsan (철산, 鐵山)
 6 myeon : Cheolsan, Baekryang, Buseo, Cham, Seorim, Yeohan
 Seoncheon (선천, 宣川)
 1 eup : Seoncheon
 8 myeon : Gunsan, Nam, Unjong, Dong, Sucheong, Sinbu, Simcheon, Yongyeon, Taesan 
 Jeongju (정주, 定州)
 1 eup : Jeongju
 12 myeon : Galsan, Godeok, Goan, Gwaksan, Gwanju, Namseo, Daejeon, Deokeon, Masan, Anheung, Okcheon, Impo
 Sakju (삭주, 朔州) (administrative center at Sakju-myeon)
 1 eup : Cheongsu
 7 myeon : Sakju, Gugok, Namseo, Sudong, Supung, Oenam, Yangsan
 Guseong (구성, 龜城)
 10 myeon : Guseong, Gwanseo, Nodong, Dongsan, Banghyeon, Sagi, Seosan, Obong, Ihyeon, Cheonma
 Yeongbyeon (영변, 寧邊)
 14 myeon : Yeongbyeon, Goseong, Namsong, Namsinhyeon, Doksan, Baekryeong, Bongsan, Buksinhyeon, Sorim, Yeonsan, Ori, Yongsan, Taepyeong, Palwon
 Bakcheon (박천, 博川)
 1 eup : Bakcheon
 7 myeon : Gasan, Deokan, Dongnam, Seo, Yangga, Yonggye, Cheongryong 
 Taecheon (태천, 泰川)
 9 myeon : Taecheon, Gangdong, Gangseo, Nam, Dong, Seo, Seoseong, Won, Jangrim
 Unsan (운산, 雲山) (administrative center at Unsan-myeon)
 1 eup : Bukjin
 4 myeon : Unsan, Dongsin, Seong, Wiyeon
 Changseong (창성, 昌城)
 5 myeon : Changseong, Daechang, Dongchang, Sinchang, Cheongsan
 Byeokdong (벽동, 碧潼)
 7 myeon : Byeokdong, Gabyeol, Gwonhoe, Seongnam, Songseo, Obuk, Usi
 Chosan (초산, 楚山)
 9 myeon : Chosan, Gang, Go, Nam, Dowon, Dong, Song, Pan, Pung
 Wiwon (위원, 渭原)
 7 myeon : Wiwon, Daedeok, Seotae, Bongsan, Sungjeong, Wisong, Hwachang
 Heuicheon (희천, 熙川)
 1 eup : Heuicheon
 7 myeon : Nam, Dong, Dongchang, Buk, Seo, Sinpung, Jangdong, Jin
 Ganggye (강계, 江界)
 2 eup : Ganggye, Manpo
 15 myeon : Ganbuk, Gosan, Gokha, Gongbuk, Seonggan, Sijung, Eoroe, Oegwi, Yongrim, Iseo, Ipgwan, Jeoncheon, Jongnam, Jongseo, Hwagyeong
 Jaseong (자성, 慈城)
 6 myeon : Jaseong, Sampung, Ipyeong, Jaha, Jangto, Junggang
 Huchang (후창, 厚昌)
 5 myeon : Huchang, Namsin, Dongheung, Dongsin, Chilpyeong

List of historic governors
1st(1949~1970):Baek Yeong Eop(백영업,白永燁)

2nd(1970~1979):Lee ha young(이하영,李夏榮)

3rd(1979~ May 1988):Lee Seok bong(이석봉,李碩峰)

4th(May 1988~December 1988):Ahn Chi Soon(안치순,安致淳)

5th(1989~March 1992). Kim Saseong(김사성,金士檉)

6th(1992~1998): Jang Jung ryol(장정렬,張正烈)

7th(1998~2000) Shim gi cheol(심기철,沈基哲)

8th (2000~2003) Paik Hyong rin(백형린,白亨麟)

9th(2003~2007) Cha in tae(차인태,車仁泰)

10th(2007~2009) Paik do woong(백도웅,白道雄)

11th(2009~2012) Paik young chul(백영철,白永哲)

12th(2012~2016) Paik gu seop(백구섭,白九燮)

13th (2016~2019) Kim Young chol(김영철,金永哲)

14th (2019~July 2022)O yeong chan(오영찬,吳永瓚)

See also 
 The Committee for the Five Northern Korean Provinces
 North Pyongan Province of the Democratic People's Republic of Korea (North Korea)
 Pyongan, historical Eight Provinces of Korea

Provinces of South Korea
States and territories established in 1949